Aminuddin Ramly (born 16 May 1990) is a Malaysian cricketer. He was part of Malaysia's squad for the 2008 Under-19 Cricket World Cup. He played in the 2014 ICC World Cricket League Division Three tournament.

In June 2019, he was named in Malaysia's squad for the 2019 Malaysia Tri-Nation Series tournament. He made his Twenty20 International (T20I) debut for Malayasia, against Thailand, on 24 June 2019. In September 2019, he was named in Malaysia's squad for the 2019 Malaysia Cricket World Cup Challenge League A tournament. He made his List A debut for Malaysia, against Denmark, in the Cricket World Cup Challenge League A tournament on 16 September 2019.

References

External links
 

1990 births
Living people
Malaysian cricketers
Malaysia Twenty20 International cricketers
People from Negeri Sembilan
Cricketers at the 2010 Asian Games
Cricketers at the 2014 Asian Games
Southeast Asian Games silver medalists for Malaysia
Southeast Asian Games medalists in cricket
Competitors at the 2017 Southeast Asian Games
Asian Games competitors for Malaysia